The Fokker F.XIV was a cargo plane built in the Netherlands in the late 1920s by Fokker. It was a high-wing cantilever monoplane of conventional trimotor layout. The sole example was tested by KLM but never put into service.

Development and design
In early 1929, Fokker designed and built a prototype of a single-engine cargo aircraft, probably to meet a requirement from KLM. The F.XIV was a high-wing monoplane powered by a  Gnome-Rhône Jupiter VI radial engine and had a fixed tailwheel undercarriage.

There was little interest from airlines in a cargo aircraft, and in 1931 Fokker rebuilt the F.XIV as a three-engined passenger airliner, the F.XIV-3m. The Jupiter was replaced by three  Lorraine Algol radial engines, while the cabin had seats for eight passengers. Although tested by KLM, it was not purchased or operated by them, and ended its days as an exhibit in a pleasure garden.

Specifications (F.XIV-3m)

See also

References

1920s Dutch cargo aircraft
F.XIV
Aircraft first flown in 1929